Gideon is a 1998 American romantic tragic comedy starring Christopher Lambert, Charlton Heston and Carroll O'Connor.  The film was directed by Claudia Hoover and written by Brad Mirman with music by Anthony Marinelli.

Plot
Gideon Oliver Dobbs is a man with a mental disability. He moves into a nursing home known as Lakeview, with many elderly inhabitants. They are all grumpy old men and women. Gideon is much younger than the other residents, which causes confusion when he first introduces himself. His view of life makes the seniors look at their lives in a different way.

Cast

References

External links

1998 films
1998 independent films
1990s romantic comedy-drama films
American independent films
American romantic comedy-drama films
Films with screenplays by Brad Mirman
Films scored by Anthony Marinelli
1998 comedy films
1998 drama films
1990s English-language films
1990s American films